This is a list of flags of different designs that have been used in Australia.

National flags

Other flags recognised under the Flags Act 1953 
Sources:

Personal flags

Sovereign

Governor-General

State Governors

Prime Minister

Coronation Standards

Civil ensigns

Australian Defence Force

Royal Australian Navy

Royal Australian Air Force

Australian Border Force 
The department names of Australia's border protection service have slightly changed over time, they are as follows;
 Department of Trade and Customs (1 January 1901 – 1956)
 Department of Customs and Excise (1956–1975)
 Department of Police and Customs (1975–1975)
 Department of Business and Consumer Affairs (1975–1982)
 Department of Industry and Commerce (1982–1984)
 Department of Industry, Technology and Commerce (1984–1985)
 Australian Customs Service (1985–2009)
 Australian Customs and Border Protection Service (2009–2015)
 Australian Border Force (2015–present)

Federal and state police

Commonwealth Lighthouse Service

Emergency Services and Health Care flags

Sporting flags

Vexillology Association flags

States and territories

States

Historical

Internal territories

External territories

Historical

Proposed states

Cities and areas

Political flags

Religious flags

Ethnic groups flags

Indigenous

Immigrants

Historical flags

House flags of Australian freight companies

Yacht clubs of Australia

Other flags/Microstate flags

See also 

 List of proposed Australian flags
 Flags of the governors of the Australian states
 List of Christmas Island Flags
 List of Cocos (Keeling) Islands Flags
 List of Norfolk Island Flags
 Advance Australia Fair
 Australian flag debate
 Flag of New Zealand

Notes

References 

Australia
 
Flags